António Soares (born 2 February 1909, date of death unknown) was a Portuguese footballer, who played as a forward.

External links 
 
 

Portuguese footballers
Association football forwards
FC Porto players
Portugal international footballers
1909 births
Year of death missing